Hurtado is a corregimiento in La Chorrera District, Panamá Oeste Province, Panama with a population of 1,206 as of 2010. Its population as of 1990 was 703; its population as of 2000 was 893.

References

Corregimientos of Panamá Oeste Province